Gordiyenki is a rural locality (a selo) in Miroshnikovskoye Rural Settlement, Kotovsky District, Volgograd Oblast, Russia. The population was 227 as of 2010. There are 5 streets.

Geography 
Gordiyenki is located in steppe, on Volga Upland, on the Tarasovka River, 38 km north of Kotovo (the district's administrative centre) by road. Miroshniki is the nearest rural locality.

References 

Rural localities in Kotovsky District